Mojave Trails National Monument is a large U.S. National Monument located in the state of California between Interstates 15 and 40. It partially surrounds the Mojave National Preserve. It was designated by President Barack Obama on February 12, 2016, along with Castle Mountains National Monument and Sand to Snow National Monument, also in southern California. It is under the administration of the Bureau of Land Management.

Features
Mojave Trails National Monument is the largest national monument in the contiguous United States and is almost entirely undeveloped. Like the adjacent Mojave National Preserve, Mojave Trails National Monument contains numerous desert mountain ranges, volcanic features, and sand dunes. Four wilderness areas are within the monument: Trilobite, Clipper Mountain, Piute Mountains and Bigelow Cholla Garden.

The most visited area in Mojave Trails National Monument is Amboy Crater, a dormant cinder cone volcano, which was a popular sight for travelers in the heyday of U.S. Route 66 from the 1920s to the 1960s.

Another area with developed recreation facilities is Afton Canyon, one of only two places where the 140-mile long Mojave River continuously flows above the ground. Afton Canyon has steep rock walls that earned it the nickname “Grand Canyon of the Mojave”.

One of the most remote areas in the monument consists of the nearly pristine Cadiz Dunes, which are orange-pink in color and almost entirely unvegetated. This dune field formed from the sand of dry lake beds. Bonanza Spring, an important water resource, and Bonanza Springs Wildlife Area is also located in the National Monument.

Cultural resources in Mojave Trails National Monument include 105 miles of historic U.S. Route 66, between Needles and Ludlow, California, the longest remaining undeveloped stretch of Route 66, as well as some of the best preserved sites from the World War II-era Desert Training Center.

See also
 List of national monuments of the United States

References

External links
Bureau of Land Management: Official Mojave Trails National Monument website
U.S. Dept. of Interior.gov:  Map of Mojave Trails National Monument — with wilderness areas.
Photo album for Mojave Trails NM by BLM.
 

 
National Monuments in California
Bureau of Land Management National Monuments
Parks in San Bernardino County, California
Protected areas of the Mojave Desert
Bureau of Land Management areas in California
Protected areas established in 2016
2016 establishments in California
Units of the National Landscape Conservation System
National Monuments designated by Barack Obama